AirAsia Cambodia is a Cambodian low-cost airline based at Phnom Penh International Airport. It is a joint venture between Malaysian low-fare airline AirAsia and Cambodian local enterprise Sivilai Asia. The airline was launched on 9 December 2022 and plans to start operations in July 2023. Cambodia is the fifth country in Southeast Asia that Capital A established AirAsia brand.

History
In May 2017, AirAsia planned to open a subsidiary company in Cambodia to handle an increase of tourists from Malaysia visiting to the Cambodian cities of Phnom Penh, Siem Reap and Sihanoukville. After a short hiatus, in November 2019, AirAsia resumed its plans to establish a Cambodian subsidiary, which was supported by the State Secretariat of Civil Aviation in January 2020.

On 9 December 2022, AirAsia and Sivilai Asia signed a joint venture agreement to establish AirAsia Cambodia. Capital A, the holding company of the AirAsia Group, would own 51% of the airline, while hospitality group Sivilai Asia would own the remaining share. Subject to regulatory approvals, the airline is planned to commence operations in late 2023.

Destinations

The airline plans to operate flights within a four-hour radius from its Cambodian bases. It would also focus on connecting ASEAN countries, as well as India, China, and North Asia.

Fleet
AirAsia Cambodia plans to start operations with two Airbus A321neos, and would expand to 15 in the near future.

References 

Airlines of Cambodia
Airlines established in 2022
Low-cost carriers
AirAsia